The men's hammer throw at the 2022 World Athletics Championships was held at the Hayward Field in Eugene on 15 and 16 July 2022.

Summary

Back in 2011, Paweł Fajdek finished 11th and last in the final.  Since then, the results have been the same, Paweł Fajdek World Champion.  He was back for another spin.

In the first round, Rudy Winkler was the first to throw over 78 with a 78.91m.  Quentin Bigot threw 79.52m to take the lead and Bence Halász was in second with 79.12m. Seven throwers were over 77 metres while Fajdek only managed 74.71m to find himself in a non-qualifying 9th place.  Leading off the second round, Olympic Champion and World Leader Wojciech Nowicki threw 80.07m to take the lead. Then Fajdek put one out to 80.58m, that's more like it. Then the next thrower Eivind Henriksen pushed him to second position by throwing an 80.87m.  Nowicki led off the third round with an 81.03m to take the lead. Later Fajdek threw  to take the lead back. Bigot and Halász both threw beyond 80 metres in the third round.  And that decided the medals.  Nobody threw over 80 the rest of the finals.

For the fifth time in a row, Fajdek won the Championships, to become the first five time gold medalist. Shelly-Ann Fraser-Pryce would duplicate the feat, non-consecutively at 100m the following day.

Records
Before the competition records were as follows:

Qualification standard
The standard to qualify automatically for entry was 77.50 m.

Schedule
The event schedule, in local time (UTC−7), was as follows:

Results

Qualification 

Qualification: Qualifying Performance 77.50 (Q) or at least 12 best performers (q) advanced to the final.

Final

References

Hammer throw
Hammer throw at the World Athletics Championships